Time Remembered is a 1961 American television film for the Hallmark Hall of Fame. It was based on the play by Jean Anouilh and directed by George Schaefer.

Cast
Christopher Plummer as Prince Albert
Edith Evans as Duchess
Janet Munro as Amanda
Barry Jones as Lord Hector
Paul Hartman as Landlord
Sig Arno as Ferdinand
Sybil Bowan as Madame Rensada

Production
The play had been performed on Broadway in 1957-58 starring Helen Hayes. It was Edith Evans' American debut.

Reception
The Los Angeles Times thought Munro carried "off the acting honours".

References

External links
Time Remembered at BFI
Time Remembered at TCMDB
Time Remembered at IMDb

1961 television films
1961 films
Films directed by George Schaefer
Hallmark Hall of Fame episodes
Films based on works by Jean Anouilh